Blanchfield may refer to :

Brian Blanchfield, American writer
Dick Blanchfield, Irish sportsperson
Michael R. Blanchfield (1950–1969), United States Army soldier and a recipient of the United States military's highest decoration
Paddy Blanchfield (1911–1980), Labour Member of Parliament for Westland and the West Coast
Peter Blanchfield (1910–1959), Irish sportsperson

Surnames of British Isles origin
Surnames of English origin
English-language surnames